Donté Dominic Greene (born February 21, 1988) is an American professional basketball player. He played college basketball for the Syracuse Orange for one year before being selected with the 28th overall pick by the Memphis Grizzlies in the 2008 NBA draft.

Early life and high school
Greene was born on the United States Air Force Base in Munich, Germany. His mother worked for the National Security Agency.  In the mid-1990s, Greene's parents divorced. Greene then attended school in Japan before returning to Germany and eventually Hanover, Pennsylvania. In October 2001, Greene's mother died of a heart attack, and Greene moved to Woodlawn, Baltimore County, Maryland with his father and brother.

Greene was named as a 2006 USA Men's U18 National Team member on June 26, 2006. He averaged 3.5 points and 1.0 rebounds per game as the USA captured a 4–0 mark and the gold medal at the 2006 FIBA Americas U18 Championship for Men in San Antonio, Texas.

He was a 2007 McDonald's All-American, Maryland's 2007 Gatorade Player of the Year, was named to the Nike Brand All-America Team and selected to play in the 2007 Jordan Classic. In the class of 2007, he ranked as the No. 7 overall recruit and No. 2 power forward by Scout.com and as No. 10 overall and the No. 3 small forward by Rivals.com.

Greene graduated in 2007 from Towson Catholic High School, where he averaged 18.4 points, 6.8 rebounds, 3.0 assists, 2.1 steals and 4.3 blocks per game as a senior in 2006–07, and helped Towson Catholic to a 32–6 record and to its second consecutive Maryland Interscholastic Athletic Association A Conference and Baltimore Catholic League titles.

Greene again played on Team USA in the 2007 USA Basketball U19 World Championships. Although he was slowed by a shoulder injury, Greene played in eight-of-nine contests and averaged 4.3 points and 1.5 rebounds. The team took home the silver medal after losing to Serbia in the championship game.

College career and statistics
In his freshman year of college, Greene started all 35 games he appeared in and led Syracuse in scoring with 17.7 points to go along with 7.2 rebounds per game. He became the first Syracuse freshmen since Carmelo Anthony to lead Syracuse in scoring, while setting a new SU freshmen record for 3-pointers in one season, notching 90, surpassing Gerry McNamara, who previously held the record with 85. Greene also led Syracuse with 57 blocks. He was named to the Big East All-Rookie Team.

Greene had 19 points and 13 rebounds in an 85–73 Syracuse victory over Seton Hall on March 5, 2008. Greene also scored a season-high 27 points in an 87–81 NIT win over Robert Morris on March 18, 2008.

Greene struggled in Big East play, where he shot just 28.6 percent (40-for-140) from downtown. While he led Syracuse in scoring, he also took more shots than anyone on the team, and had more turnovers (91) than assists (71). He was also criticized for his poor shot selection and porous defense. Greene and Jonny Flynn were the country's second-highest scoring freshman duo. In April 2008, Greene declared himself eligible for the NBA draft.

|-
| align="left" | 2007–08
| align="left" | Syracuse
| 35 || 35 || 35.8 || .418 || .345 || .707 || 7.2 || 2.0 || 1.3 || 1.6 || 17.7
|}

Professional career
In the pick that they received from the Los Angeles Lakers as part of the Pau Gasol trade, the Memphis Grizzlies selected Greene with the 28th overall pick in the 2008 NBA draft. He was later traded by Memphis to the Houston Rockets. Greene signed with the Rockets on July 15, 2008 and proceeded to score 40 points in his summer league debut at the Thomas & Mack Center in Las Vegas. He hit 12–20 field goals, including 5-of-10 threes, to go along with 11-of-12 free throws. On August 14, 2008, Greene was traded to the Sacramento Kings.

On January 10, 2009, Greene was assigned to the Reno Bighorns of the NBA Development League. He was the first player the Kings had ever sent to the D-League. In his first game with Reno, he scored 26 points in a 93–91 Bighorns win over the Bakersfield Jam. After performances of 14, 18, and 16 points in his next three games, he scored 28 points, with 14 scored in the final quarter, in a 117–103 win over the Utah Flash on January 17. Greene was recalled by the Kings that same day.

On March 11, 2013, Greene signed with the Atléticos de San Germán of Puerto Rico for the 2013 BSN season. On April 5, 2013, he left Atléticos after just one game.

On April 17, 2013, Greene signed with the Memphis Grizzlies for the remainder of the season. In July 2013, he joined the Grizzlies for the 2013 NBA Summer League.

On August 15, 2013, he was traded to the Boston Celtics in exchange for Fab Melo. He was waived by the Celtics on September 17, 2013. Later that month, he signed with the Dongguan Leopards of China for the 2013–14 season, and joined the Leopards for their tour of New Zealand. He scored 41 points in their first of three games against the New Zealand Breakers.

In July 2014, Greene joined the Brooklyn Nets for the 2014 NBA Summer League. In December 2014, he joined Dubai's club Al-Nasr for the 2014–15 season. The next season, he also played in the UAE National Basketball League, but with Al Sharjah. In May 2016, he signed with Ohud Medina of the Saudi Premier League.

In August 2016, Greene signed with the Leones de Santo Domingo. He led his team to the LNB Championship in the Dominican Republic.

On January 10, 2017, he signed with the Capitanes de Arecibo of Puerto Rico.

On September 3, 2017, he signed with Sporting Al Riyadi Beirut of the Lebanese Basketball League.

On January 4, 2020, Greene signed with Al-Ahli Jeddah of Saudi Basketball League.

On October 7, 2021, Greene signed with Taichung Wagor Suns of T1 League. On March 23, 2022, Greene was not registered in the 2021–22 T1 League season final rosters.

The Basketball Tournament (TBT)
In the summer of 2017, Greene competed in The Basketball Tournament on ESPN for Boeheim's Army; a team composed of Syracuse University basketball alum.  In four games, he averaged 14.0 points and 4.8 rebounds per game to help lead Boeheim's Army to the Semifinal Round where they fell 81–77 to the eventual champions Overseas Elite.  Greene also played one game for Boeheim's Army in 2016.

NBA career

Career statistics

Regular season 

|-
| style="text-align:left;"| 
| style="text-align:left;"| Sacramento
| 55 || 4 || 13.2 || .326 || .260 || .853 || 1.6 || .5 || .3 || .3 || 3.8
|-
| style="text-align:left;"| 
| style="text-align:left;"| Sacramento
| 76 || 50 || 21.4 || .441 || .377 || .643 || 3.1 || .9 || .5 || .7 || 8.5
|-
| style="text-align:left;"| 
| style="text-align:left;"| Sacramento
| 69 || 21 || 16.3 || .404 || .292 || .662 || 2.1 || .7 || .5 ||.3 || 5.8
|-
| style="text-align:left;"| 
| style="text-align:left;"| Sacramento
| 53 || 7 || 14.7 || .406 || .238 || .800 || 2.5 || .6 || .3 || .5 || 5.4
|-
| style="text-align:left;"| Career
| style="text-align:left;"| 
| 253 || 82 || 16.8 || .406 || .304 || .701 || 2.4 || .7 || .4 || .5 || 6.1

See also

References

External links
 
 

1988 births
Living people
African-American basketball players
American expatriate basketball people in China
American expatriate basketball people in Lebanon
American expatriate basketball people in Saudi Arabia
American expatriate basketball people in the Philippines
American expatriate basketball people in the Dominican Republic
American expatriate basketball people in the United Arab Emirates
American men's basketball players
Atléticos de San Germán players
Basketball players from Baltimore
Basketball players from Pennsylvania
Big3 players
Capitanes de Arecibo players
McDonald's High School All-Americans
Memphis Grizzlies draft picks
National Basketball Association players from Germany
German men's basketball players
Parade High School All-Americans (boys' basketball)
People from Hanover, Pennsylvania
People from Towson, Maryland
Philippine Basketball Association imports
Power forwards (basketball)
Reno Bighorns players
Sacramento Kings players
Shenzhen Leopards players
Small forwards
Sportspeople from Baltimore County, Maryland
Sportspeople from Munich
Syracuse Orange men's basketball players
TNT Tropang Giga players
Al Riyadi Club Beirut basketball players
21st-century African-American sportspeople
American men's 3x3 basketball players